The Beechdale Bridge, also known as the Burkholder Bridge, is a historic covered bridge in Brothersvalley Township, Somerset County, Pennsylvania.  Township Route 548 crosses Buffalo Creek on the bridge, southwest of Berlin. The Burr truss bridge was built in 1870 by an unknown builder and is owned by the county.  A distinctive feature of the bridge is the low sidewalls, which leave much of the structure open to view.  It is one of 10 covered bridges in Somerset County.

It was added to the National Register of Historic Places in 1980.

References

Covered bridges in Somerset County, Pennsylvania
Covered bridges on the National Register of Historic Places in Pennsylvania
Bridges completed in 1870
Bridges in Somerset County, Pennsylvania
National Register of Historic Places in Somerset County, Pennsylvania
Road bridges on the National Register of Historic Places in Pennsylvania
Wooden bridges in Pennsylvania
Burr Truss bridges in the United States